Bliss Dam is a concrete gravity-type hydroelectric dam on the Snake River, in the U.S. state of Idaho. The dam is located near Bliss, Idaho.

Along with the Upper Salmon Falls and Lower Salmon Falls dam projects, Bliss Dam is part of Idaho Power Company's Mid-Snake Projects. The Mid-Snake Projects in total have a nameplate capacity of 169.5 MW.

See also

List of dams in the Columbia River watershed

References

Dams in Idaho
Buildings and structures in Elmore County, Idaho
Buildings and structures in Gooding County, Idaho
Hydroelectric power plants in Idaho
Idaho Power dams
Dams completed in 1950
Energy infrastructure completed in 1950
Dams on the Snake River